Christ and the Penitent Sinners or Christ with the four great penitents is an oil on canvas painting by Peter Paul Rubens, executed in 1617. It is now in the Alte Pinakothek in Munich. 

The painting depicts Jesus Christ with an adoring Mary Magdalene, Saint Peter (who denied Christ three times), Dismas (the penitent thief from the Crucifixion) and King David (who committed adultery with Bathsheba).

External links
https://web.archive.org/web/20160304084357/http://www.codart.com/exhibitions/details/3071/
Willibald Sauerlander, The Catholic Rubens: Saints and Martyrs, page 70]

1617 paintings
Paintings by Peter Paul Rubens
Collection of the Alte Pinakothek
Paintings depicting Jesus
Paintings depicting Saint Peter
Paintings depicting Mary Magdalene